Calon Minors (born 11 July 1996) is a Bermudian international footballer who plays for BAA Wanderers, as a left back.

Career
Manors played college soccer for the USC Upstate Spartans between 2014 and 2017. He has played club football for BAA Wanderers.

In August 2018 he began playing for the Soccer Management Institute in Italy.

He made his international debut for Bermuda in 2017.

References

1996 births
Living people
Bermudian footballers
Bermuda international footballers
USC Upstate Spartans men's soccer players
Association football fullbacks
Bermudian expatriate footballers
Bermudian expatriate sportspeople in the United States
Expatriate soccer players in the United States
Bermudian expatriates in Italy
Expatriate footballers in Italy
2019 CONCACAF Gold Cup players
BAA Wanderers F.C. players